Festival de Música de Jimena de la Frontera is a music festival in Jimena de la Frontera, Spain.

References

Music festivals in Spain
Jimena de la Frontera